The 1990 Australian Film Institute Awards were awards held by the Australian Film Institute to celebrate the best of Australian films and television of 1990. Twenty films competed in the feature film categories.

Feature film

Television

References

External links
 Official AACTA website

AACTA Awards ceremonies
1990 in Australian cinema